The 2005 Connecticut Huskies football team represented the University of Connecticut in the 2005 NCAA Division I-A football season as a member of the Big East Conference. The team was led by seventh-year head coach Randy Edsall and played its home games at Rentschler Field in East Hartford, Connecticut.

Schedule

References

Connecticut
UConn Huskies football seasons
Connecticut Huskies football